Lockerbie Academy is a mainstream non-denominational secondary school in Lockerbie, Scotland. The head teacher is Brian Asher. The school roll is around 800.

External links
Official site

Secondary schools in Dumfries and Galloway
1903 establishments in Scotland
Lockerbie